= Near-Earth orbit =

Near-Earth orbit or Near Earth orbit may refer to:

- Low Earth orbit, orbits around Earth that are near it
- Near-Earth space, space of the main geocentric orbits
- Near-Earth object orbits, Solar orbits that bring things in those orbits near the orbit of the Earth
